Eastern Bypass may refer to one of the following highways:

 Fremantle Eastern Bypass, a former proposed highway in Fremantle, Western Australia, Australia
 Isfahan Eastern Bypass Freeway, a freeway in Greater Isfahan Region, Isfahan, Iran
 N3 Eastern Bypass (South Africa), a section of the Johannesburg Ring Road
 Nairobi Eastern Bypass Highway, a highway in Nairobi, Kenya
 Pretoria Eastern Bypass, consisting of the N1 (South Africa), a section of the Pretoria Ring Road

See also
 Eastern Metropolitan Bypass, a highway in Kolkata, India